The machete is a small stringed instrument from Madeira, Portugal. It has a double bulged body, traditionally made of wood, with a small rib and has four metallic strings, which depending on the region, may be attached by wooden pegs.  Its slightly larger cousin, the machete de rajão, has five metal strings. Nowadays, it is not uncommon for the instrument to be made out of linden or poplar. Historians believe the machete was introduced in Madeira from Braga as a braguinha and subsequently brought to Hawaii by Portuguese immigrants in the late 19th century as a possible predecessor of the ukulele.

See also 
 Rajão
 Cavaquinho
 Ukulele

References 

Portuguese musical instruments
Guitar family instruments
Portuguese words and phrases
Lute family instruments
Necked box lutes